Wilhelm Mohr (3 December 1838 in Münstereifel - 25 November 1888 in Silesia) was a German journalist and employee of the Kölnische Zeitung.

Biography

Wilhelm Mohr first studied theology in Bonn. In 1863, he received a doctorate on Sophocles. In 1864 he found a job as a teacher at the Marzellengymnasium in Cologne. From 1869 to 1871 he worked as a journalist in Rome and Florence. Then from 1874 to 1875 he also worked as a journalist in Spain.

In August 1876 he wrote the letters of a patron saint to the Kölnische Zeitung while in Bayreuth.

In 1883 Wilhelm Mohr visited America to attend the opening of the Northern Pacific Railway as a representative of the Kölnische Zeitung, then stayed in Italy for another year (Turin exhibition in 1884).

Works

 The founding of music. An epilogue to the laying of the foundation stone in Baireuther. Cologne 1872.
 Eighteen months in Spain. Cologne 1876.
 Richard Wagner and the artwork of the future in the light of the Baireuther performance. Cologne 1876.
 With a return ticket to the Pacific Ocean. Stuttgart 1884.
 Antwerp. The general exhibition in letters to the Kölnische Zeitung. Cologne 1885.

References

1838 births
1888 deaths
German journalists